Étienne Dagon (born 13 September 1960 in Biel/Bienne) is a former breaststroke swimmer from Switzerland who won the bronze medal in the men's 200 m breaststroke at the 1984 Summer Olympics in Los Angeles, California. For that performance he was named Swiss Sportsman of the Year.

References
  databaseOlympics
  Interview

1960 births
Living people
People from Biel/Bienne
Swiss male breaststroke swimmers
Swimmers at the 1984 Summer Olympics
Swimmers at the 1988 Summer Olympics
Olympic bronze medalists for Switzerland
Olympic swimmers of Switzerland
Place of birth missing (living people)
Olympic bronze medalists in swimming
European Aquatics Championships medalists in swimming
Medalists at the 1984 Summer Olympics
Sportspeople from the canton of Bern
20th-century Swiss people